"Ghost in the Machine" is a song by American singer-songwriter SZA from her second studio album, SOS (2022).

Background 

SZA released her debut studio album, Ctrl, in 2017. Primarily an R&B album that deals with themes like heartbreak, it received widespread acclaim for its vocals and eclectic musical style, as well as the emotional impact and confessional nature of its songwriting. The album brought SZA to mainstream fame, and critics credit it with establishing her status as a major figure in contemporary pop and R&B music and pushing the boundaries of the R&B genre. Her next studio album was therefore highly anticipated, and she alluded to its completion as early as August 2019 during an interview with DJ Kerwin Frost.

From April to May 2022, SZA told media outlets that she had recently finished the album in Hawaii and said that it was coming soon. Wanting to experiment with genres she had not yet incorporated in her discography, she envisioned it to be an amalgamation of various disparate musical styles, or in her words, "a little bit of everything". While some tracks had an "aggressive" sound, certain others were balladic, soft, or heartfelt. Apart from the "traditional" R&B that had been a staple of SZA's past works, the album also contained prominent elements of "acoustic singer-songwriter" music.

During the build-up to the album's release, SZA created a list of possible collaborators for the album. The roster ranged from Billie Eilish, Harry Styles, and Olivia Rodrigo; to Doja Cat, Drake, and Kendrick Lamar. Of the several artists she contacted for the album, only three people sent their verses: Don Toliver, Travis Scott, and Phoebe Bridgers. Toliver and Scott appear in the tracks "Used" and "Open Arms", respectively, while Bridgers contributed vocals for "Ghost in the Machine".

Release and reception 

During a Billboard cover story published in November 2022, SZA revealed the album title, as well as the release date which was scheduled sometime next month. She posted the album's track list on Twitter on December 5, and SOS was released four days later. Out of 23 songs, "Ghost in the Machine" appears as the twelfth track. It peaked at number 40 on the Billboard Hot 100, Bridgers' first top 40 song in the United States, and appeared in national charts for Canada, Australia, and Portugal. On the Billboard Global 200, the song peaked at number 52. "Ghost in the Machine" had its live performance debut on March 4, 2023, at the Madison Square Garden in New York City as part of a North American tour in support of SOS. Bridgers appeared as the concert's surprise guest, who joined SZA in performing her verse.

Charts

Notes

References 

2022 songs
SZA songs
Phoebe Bridgers songs
Songs written by SZA
Songs written by Phoebe Bridgers